Synterra Media is the national backbone communication carrier of Russia, which provides a comprehensive range of telecommunication services to national corporations, public structures, corporate customers, communication operators, content providers and private users in the territory of Russia and the CIS countries, Baltic states, Europe and Asia. It is fully owned by Multiregional TransitTelecom.

History
In the mid 2000s, Mohamed Amersi, who headed the American investment bank Gramercy Communications Partners and Juan Villalonga created the Emergent Telecom Ventures (ETV) fund which gained control of numerous Russian fixed telecommunications firms including the Moscow-based firms Komet, Globus-Telecom and Telekom-Center; the St. Petersburg based Peterstar, and backbone internet operator RTKomm.ru «РТКомм.ру» which was established in 2000. In 2005, Synterra merged with ETV to become a major alternative fixed-line operator under the control of Eventis Telecom Holdings (Cyprus) (ETH), which was owned by Dmitry Ivanter and Vladimir Androsik, and was close to the "St. Petersburg group of communications" and the Leonid Reiman associated "Telecominvest". Promsvyazkapital took control of Synterra.

Owners 
The company was founded in 2006. The aim of  the company is to develop Synterra's media projects. In September, 2009  Synterra Group of Companies (GC) got operational control of Synterra Media as GC bought 40,01% stocks. GC  "Synterra" owns 60% of "Synterra Media". That gives GC the right to make decisions on further development of this project.

In 2010, Megafon under the leadership of Sergey Soldatenkov gained control of Synterra Media with a 60% stake and spun off to Rostelecom several assets including RTKomm.ru, Telecom-Center (renamed Synterra-Media) and Globus-Telecom.

On 22 October 2020, PJSC Rostelecom agreed to buy a 100% stake in ZAO Synterra Media from MTT for 1.5 billion rubles which allows MTT to focus on the integration of real-time telecom services or Unified Communications and Telecom API. Synterra delivers and distributes media content from the event venues to the television broadcasting companies such as Channel One, VGTRK, NTV, Russia Today, TV Center, Match TV. Both directly and through its subsidiaries, MTT had consolidated its 100% stake in Synterra Media in 2013. As of 2014, MTT, which has 25 million subscribers, competes with Inoventika for cloud computing.

Activities 
 Operator of TV-lines network.
 Processing and delivery of TV-signal
 Business partner for operators of cable TV.
 Variant platform IPTV for regional operators of broadband Internet access.

Activity 
 supply of on-line TV broadcast from International Song Contest “Eurovision-2009”
 supply of  online broadcast of the  Shanghai Cooperation Organisation (SCO) and  Brasilia-Russia-India-China(BRIC) summits
 principal partner for "live" broadcast of Football Championship of Russia
 technical partner of HD channel “2 Спорт 2” devoted to Winter Olympiad in Vancouver
 telecommunication supply of on-line TV broadcasting for leading Russian TV companies of Moscow events devoted to the Victory Day
 telecommunication supply of on-line broadcasting for Russian TV companies and operators of pay TV channels from 2010 FIFA World Cup
 TV broadcast from St. Petersburg International Economic Forum

New Digital TV 
"Synterra Media" and Microsoft negotiated cooperation. Companies offer joint decision of extra services for IPTV development for regional operators of broadband Internet access. The new digital TV on the base of Microsoft MediaRoom platform was launched in test mode on 1 July 2010.

Notes

References

References
Official Company website

Telecommunications companies of Russia
Companies based in Moscow
Russian companies established in 2006